BMSS may refer to:

Brihan Maharashtra Sugar Syndicate Ltd., an Indian sugar company headquartered in Pune
British Mass Spectrometry Society, a registered charity encouraging participation in every aspect of mass spectrometry
Bukit Merah Secondary School, a secondary school in Bukit Merah, Singapore